Yenigandla Vijaya (born 8 February 1957) is an Indian actress and classical dancer. She has appeared in more than 1000 films in Tamil, Telugu, Malayalam and Kannada languages.

Early life and education
Y. Vijaya was born on 8 February 1957 in Kurnool, Andhra Pradesh. She was brought up in Kadapa, Andhra Pradesh. Her father Yenigandla Jnanayya is a district manager in a cooperative marketing society. Her mother Balamma was a house-wife. Her family originally hailed from Guntur district. Vijaya has 9 siblings; 5 sisters, and 4 brothers. She is fifth among them.  One of her brothers Y. Raja is a TV actor.

She studied in Government girls high school in Kadapa till her 8th standard. She was interested in Science and Hindi subjects. Her parents observed that she was dancing to the tune of Radio music when she was just three years old. Also she used to dance in her school for stage shows. So they decided to teach her dance. 

During summer holidays after she finished her 8th standard, her parents took her to Vempati China Sathyam, famous dance guru to teach her dance. To continue dance classes, they decided to join her in Kesari High school in Chennai. She studied 9th and 10th standard in that school. Her dance performance debut was in 1975 in Kadapa. Later she did many stage shows in Tamil Nadu. Once there were floods in their place. Actors N. T. Rama Rao, and Akkineni Nageswara Rao visited their place to gather money for the flood-affected areas. She met them for the first time. She went on to play heroine against N.T. Rama Rao in the film Sri Krishna Satya.

Film career
She used to learn dance under Vempati China Satyam in Madras. Once, the producers of the film Nindu Hrudayalu visited their dance institute and roped her in for a beggar character who also knows dance. That was her first opportunity in films.

Personal life
Vijaya married Amalanathan on 27 January 1985. He used to work as a correspondent in a college. After retiring, he entered into business. Vijaya lives in Mahalingapuram, Chennai with her family. She has a daughter Anushya who got married in 2013.

Filmography

Tamil

 Vani Rani (1974)
 Manmatha Leelai (1976)
 Moondru Mudichu (1976)
 Asai 60 Naal (1976)
 Pennai Solli Kuttramillai (1977)
 Raghupathi Raghavan Rajaram (1977)
 Avar Enakke Sontham (1977)
 Aarupushpangal (1977)
 Balaparichai (1977)
 Navarathinam (1977)
 Chakravarthi (1977)
 Aval Oru Athisayam (1978)
 Mudi Sooda Mannan (1978)
 Punniya Boomi (1978)
 Shri Kanchi Kamakshi (1978)
 Ival Oru Seethai (1978)
 Bairavi (1978)
 Ithu Eppadi Irukku (1978)
 Chakkalathi (1979)
 Rusi Kanda Poonai (1980)
 Engamma Maharani (1981)
 Pattam Parakkattum (1981)
 Kilinjalgal (1981)
 Thillu Mullu (1981)
 Thanikattu Raja (1982)
 Marumagale Vazhga (1982)
 Nadodi Raja (1982)
 Kadhalithu Par (1982)
 Mann Vasanai (1983)
 Nallavanuku Nallavan (1984)
 Sanga Natham (1984)
 Aathora Aatha (1984)
 Antha Uravukku Satchi (1984)
 Nyayam Ketkiren (1984)
 Vaazhkai (1984)
 Unnai Naan Santhithen (1984)
 Poovilangu (1984)
 Nooravathu Naal (1984)
 Nilavu Suduvathillai (1984)
 Ingeyum Oru Gangai (1984)
 Mayoori (1985)
 Police Police (1985)
 Mangamma Sapatham (1985)
 Kalyana Agathigal (1985)
 Neethiyin Marupakkam (1985)
 Anbin Mugavari (1985)
 Kaakki Sattai (1985)
 Karimedu Karuvayan (1986)
 Muthal Vasantham (1986)
 Sippikkul Muthu (1986)
 Mythili Ennai Kaathali (1986)
 Marumagal (1986)
 December Pookal (1986)
 Sarvam Sakthimayam (1986)
 Jaathi Pookkal (1987)
 Koottu Puzhukkal (1987)
 Enga Ooru Pattukaran (1987)
 Jaathi Pookkal (1987)
 Aval Mella Sirithal (1988)
 En Thangai Kalyani (1988)
 Raththa Dhanam (1988)
 Thanga Kalasam (1988)
 Enga Ooru Kavalkaran (1988)
 Mounam Sammadham (1989)
 Rajadhi Raja (1989)
 Thendral Puyalnadhu (1989)
 Paandi Nattu Thangam (1989)
 Aadi Velli (1990)
 Periya Veetu Pannakkaran (1990)
 Manaivi Oru Manickam (1990)
 Naanum Indha Ooruthan (1990)
 Shanti Enathu Shanti (1991)
 Pondatti Pondattithan (1991)
 Nattukku Oru Nallavan (1991)
 Rendu Pondatti Kaavalkaaran (1992)
 Nadodi Pattukkaran (1992)...Vadivu
 Vaaname Ellai (1992)
 Pattukottai Periyappa (1994)
 Pudhiya Mannargal (1994)
 Varavu Ettana Selavu Pathana (1994)
 Subash (1996)
 Rajakali Amman (2000)
 Kann Thirandhu Paaramma (2000)
 Sonnal Thaan Kaadhala (2001)
 Priyamana Thozhi (2003)
 Manase Mounama (2007)

Telugu

 Iddaru Mitrulu (1961)
 Thalli Thandrulu (1970)
 Sri Krishna Satya (1972)
 Vichitra Bandham (1972) 
 Sri Krishnanjaneya Yuddham (1973) 
 Dabbuki Lokam Dasoham (1973)
 Ganga Manga (1973)
 Number One (1973)
 Chairman Chalamayya (1974)
 Mangammagari Manavadu (1984)
 Mayuri
 Anveshana (1985)
 Preminchu Pelladu (1985)
 Maa Pallelo Gopaludu (1985)
 Pratighatana (1985)
 Murali Krishnudu
 Repati Pourulu (1986)
 Magadheerudu (1986)
 Ladies Tailor (1986)
 Agni Putrudu (1987)
 Allari Krishnaiah (1987)
 Manavadostunnadu (1987)
 Gouthami(1987 film) (1987)
 Punnami Chandruudu (1987)
 Sankeertana (1987)
 Bhale Mogudu (1987)
 Makutamleni Maharaju (1987)
 Manmadha Leela Kamaraju Gola (1987)
 Mandaladeesudu (1987)
 Donga Kollu (1988)
 Station Master
 Sarvam Sakthimayam
 Kaliyuga Pandavulu
 Nallavanuku Nallavan
 Chalaki Mogudu Chadastapu Pellam (1989)
 Bandhuvulostunnaru Jagratha (1989)
 Iddaru Pellala Muddula Police (1990)
 Attintlo Adde Mogudu (1990)
 Dagudumuthala Dampathyam (1990)
 Edurinti Mogudu Pakkinti Pellam (1991)
 Shiva Shakti (1991)
 Edurinti Mogudu Pakkinti Pellam (1991)
 Shanti Kranti
 April 1 Vidudala (1991)
 Swati Mutyam
 Yamudiki Mogudu
 Brahma Putrudu
 Golmaal Govindam (1992)
 Pachani Samsaram (1992)
 Mogudu Pellala Dongata (1992)
 Pellam Chepte Vinali (1993)
 Kannayya Kittayya (1993)
 Nippu Ravva (1993)
 Matru Devo Bhava (1993)
 Gandeevam (1994)
 Namaste Anna (1994)
 Ammoru (1995)
 Gulabi (1995)
 Lingababu Love Story(1995)
 Maya Bazaar (1995)
 Rambantu (1996)
 Amma Durgamma (1996)
 Pelli (1997)
 Abbai Gari Pelli (1997)
 Anaganaga Oka Roju (1997)
 Suswagatham (1998)
 Subhakankshalu (1998)
 Pandaga (1998)
 GilliKajjalu (1998)
 Andaru Hero Le (1998)
 Preethsod Thappa (1998)
  Arundathi (1999)
 Vichitram (1999)
 Raja (1999)
 Veedu Samanyudu Kadhu  (1999)
 Nuvvu Vastavani (2000)
 Sakutumba Saparivaara Sametam (2000)
 Budget Padmanabham (2001)
 Chatrapathi (2005)
 True Friends (2018)
 F2 - Fun and Frustration (2019)
 Tenali Ramakrishna BA. BL (2019)
 F3 (2021)

Malayalam
 Madaalasa (1978)
 Sandhyakku Virinja Poovu (1983)
 Poomadhathe Pennu Police Annamma (1984)
 Uyarum Njan Nadake (1985)...Vasumathi Amma
 Abhayam Thedi (1986)...Tessy
 Vasudha (1992)
 Indraprastham (1996) ... Susanna John
 Devadasi (1999)

Kannada
 Lakshmi Nivasa (1977)
 Poomadhathe Pennu (1984)
 Shanti Kranti (1991)
 Shivanaga (1992)
 Simhada Mari (1997) 
 Preethsod Thappa (1998)

Hindi
 Meethi Meethi Baatein (1977)
 Shanti Kranti (1991)

Television

References

External links
 

1957 births
Living people
Telugu actresses
Indian film actresses
Actresses in Malayalam cinema
Actresses in Tamil cinema
Actresses in Kannada cinema
Actresses in Hindi cinema
Actresses in Tamil television
Actresses from Andhra Pradesh
Actresses in Telugu television
20th-century Indian actresses
Indian television actresses
Actresses in Telugu cinema
People from Kurnool
People from Kadapa